The 1959–60 Montreal Canadiens season was the club's 51st season of play. The team had another outstanding season, placing first in the league and winning the Stanley Cup for the fifth consecutive season, and the 12th time in team history.

Regular season
On Sunday, November 1, 1959, at 3:06 of the first period, Jacques Plante was hit in the face by a shot fired by Andy Bathgate. Plante came back in the game wearing a mask (the second goaltender in NHL history to wear a mask after Clint Benedict) starting a trend where all NHL goaltenders today wear a mask.

Jacques Plante
The use of the goalie mask was Plante's most enduring contribution to the game, however, occurred as a result of an incident on November 1, 1959. He was hit in the face by a shot from New York Rangers player Andy Bathgate, needing to go to the dressing room for stitches. When he returned, he was wearing the crude home-made goalie mask that he'd been using in practices. His coach, Toe Blake, was livid, but he had no other goalie to call upon, and Plante refused to return to the goal unless he kept the mask. Blake agreed on the condition that Plante discard the mask when the cut healed. Only Camille Henry beat him in that game, which the Canadiens won 3–1.  In the ensuing days Plante refused to discard the mask, and as the Canadiens continued to win, Blake became less obstinate. The unbeaten streak stretched to 18 games. Plante didn't wear the mask, at Blake's request, against Detroit on March 8, 1960. The Canadiens lost 3–0, and the mask returned for good the next night. Plante subsequently designed his own mask and masks for other goalies. Although Plante was not the first NHL goalie known to wear a facemask (Montreal Maroons goaltender Clint Benedict had done so thirty years before), Plante introduced the mask as everyday equipment, which continues to this day.

Final standings

Record vs. opponents

Schedule and results

Playoffs
The Canadiens placed first in the standings and met the Chicago Black Hawks in the first round of the playoffs. The Canadiens swept the Hawks 4–0 to move on to the finals against Toronto.

Stanley Cup finals

Montreal swept the Maple Leafs, outscoring them 15–5, en route to being the first team since the 1952 Detroit Red Wings to go without a loss in the playoffs.

After the series Rocket Richard retired. He went out with style, finishing with his 34th finals goal in game three.

Toronto Maple Leafs vs. Montreal Canadiens

Montreal wins best-of-seven series 4 games to 0.

Player statistics

Regular season
Scoring

Goaltending

Playoffs
Scoring

Goaltending

Awards and records

Transactions

See also
 1959–60 NHL season
 List of Stanley Cup champions

References

Canadiens on Hockey Database
Canadiens on NHL Reference

Stanley Cup championship seasons
Montreal Canadiens seasons
Mon
Mon
1960 Stanley Cup
1950s in Montreal
1959 in Quebec
1960 in Quebec
1960s in Montreal